Christian Barranco (born December 31, 1969) is an American politician who has served in the New Jersey General Assembly from the 26th district since taking office on January 11, 2022. He served on the Pompton Lakes Borough Council from 2017 to 2019.

New Jersey General Assembly
At the Morris County Republican convention in March 2021, incumbent Jay Webber and Barranco won the party's nomination for the "county line" for Assembly, ahead of incumbent BettyLou DeCroce. Webber and Barranco defeated DeCroce in the June primary for the Republican nomination.

Barranco won the election with his Republican running mate, Jay Webber, defeating Republicans Melissa Brown Blauuer and Pamela Fadden by a margin of almost 14,000 votes.

Committees 
Committee assignments for the current session are:
Science, Innovation and Technology
Transportation and Independent Authorities
Telecommunications and Utilities

District 26 
Each of the 40 districts in the New Jersey Legislature has one representative in the New Jersey Senate and two members in the New Jersey General Assembly. The representatives from the 26th District for the 2022—23 Legislative Session are:
Senator Joseph Pennacchio (R)
Assemblyman Christian Barranco (R)
Assemblyman Jay Webber (R)

References

External links
Legislative web page

1969 births
Living people
New Jersey city council members
Politicians from Passaic County, New Jersey
Republican Party members of the New Jersey General Assembly
People from Pompton Lakes, New Jersey
Hispanic and Latino American state legislators in New Jersey
American politicians of Cuban descent